Thyrosticta bruneata is a moth of the subfamily Arctiinae first described by Paul Griveaud in 1969. It is native to Madagascar.

The male of this species has a wingspan of 18 mm, the female 22 mm. The forewings are dark brown, with one ochreous-yellow post basal spot, another whitish spot and two small whitish antemarginal spots. Hindwings are uniformly ochreous yellow without external border

References

Arctiinae
Moths described in 1969
Moths of Madagascar
Moths of Africa